Bloor–Lansdowne GO Station (also referred to as Lansdowne GO Station) is a planned commuter train station in Toronto, Ontario, Canada. It will be an infill station on the Barrie line of GO Transit located between the future  and  stations. Bloor–Lansdowne is one of five GO stations to be built as part of the SmartTrack Stations Program to adapt regional commuter service for urban public transit.

Bloor–Lansdowne station was announced in June 2016.

A contract to construct the station will be awarded in 2022 with an expected completion in 2026.

Description
Bloor–Lansdowne station will be located on the south side of Bloor Street, west of St. Helens Avenue along the Barrie line's two-track rail corridor. The main entrance will be on the south side of Bloor Street just below the east side of the railway bridge. At the south end of the station there will be an entrance from St. Helens Avenue on the east side, and from Sterling Road on the west side. There will be a tunnel to connect the north- and southbound platforms with access by stairs and elevators. Bicycle parking and a drop-off area that can support passengers using paratransit vehicles will be provided.

A multi-use path will pass along the east side of the station, and cross Bloor Street parallel to the railway overpass. At the south end, it will connect with the West Toronto Rail Path. At the north end, it will connect with the Davenport Diamond Greenway, from which pedestrians can turn off to walk east along Wade Avenue to access Lansdowne subway station.

TTC connections
TTC routes that would serve the new station are:
 47 Lansdowne at Lansdowne Avenue
 Line 2 Bloor–Danforth at  station

References

External links
 GO Transit – Environmental Assessments

Future GO Transit railway stations
Transport in Toronto
Proposed railway stations in Canada